Keshon Lorenzo Johnson (July 17, 1970) is a former American football cornerback in the National Football League. He played college football at Arizona. He was drafted by the Chicago Bears in the seventh round (173rd overall) of the 1993 NFL Draft.

Early years
Johnson attended Edison High School before enrolling at Fresno City College. He then transferred to the University of Arizona. While at Arizona, he was an All-Pac-10 selection in 1992. That same season, he was named a member of the Bill Belichick coached NFC roster for the 1993 Senior Bowl.

Professional career

Johnson was drafted by the Chicago Bears in the seventh round (173rd overall) of the 1993 NFL Draft. During his rookie season, he appeared in 15 games. He recorded five tackles. In 1994, he appeared in six games and recorded two tackles. He was waived on October 29, 1994. On November 2, he was claimed off waivers by the Green Bay Packers. With the Packers, he appeared in seven games, recording one interception. He was waived by the Packers on April 28, 1995. He began the 1995 NFL season with the Detroit Lions, but did not appear in any games. He re-joined the Bears and appeared in 12 games and recorded one tackle. After the season, he became a restricted free agent.

References

Sportspeople from Fresno, California
Chicago Bears players
Green Bay Packers players
Detroit Lions players
American football defensive backs
University of Arizona alumni
Arizona Wildcats football players
1970 births
Living people